Control surface may refer to:
 Audio control surface, a human interface device (HID) which allows the user to control a digital audio
 Flight control surfaces, allow a pilot to adjust and control the aircraft's flight attitude
 Diving plane, a control surface in submarines
 Control surface (fluid dynamics), a surfaceenclosing a control volumethrough which a fluid flow occurs